Condylognatha or Panhemiptera is a monophyletic grouping (superorder) that contains Hemiptera (true bugs) and Thysanoptera (thrips). Condylognatha belongs to Paraneoptera, which include its sister group, lice (Psocodea).

Taxonomy 
Hemiptera and Thysanoptera are both the sister-groups based on morphological characters, and jointly known as Condylognatha.

Hemiptera
 

Hemiptera  is an order of insects most often known as the true bugs (cf. bug), comprising around 50,000–80,000 species of cicadas, aphids, planthoppers, leafhoppers, shield bugs, bed bugs and others.

Thrips
 

Order Thysanoptera includes 5,500 species classified into two suborders distinguished by the ovipositor. Terebrantia have a well-developed conical ovipositor, while the Tubulifera do not. Instead the abdomen is drawn out in the shape of a tube. These insects are called thrips.

Phylogeny

References

 
Insect superorders
Paraneoptera